|}

The Round Tower Stakes is a Group 3 flat horse race in Ireland open to two-year-old thoroughbreds. It is run at the Curragh over a distance of 6 furlongs (1,207 metres), and it is scheduled to take place each year in late August or early September.

The event was formerly contested over 5 furlongs, and it used to be classed at Listed level. It was extended to 6 furlongs in 1991, and promoted to Group 3 status in 2004.

The Round Tower Stakes was sponsored by Moyglare Stud from 1993 to 2013 and its full title included the name of Go and Go, a successful Moyglare racehorse. The 2014 running was sponsored by Nestlé, supporting the Irish Autism Action charity.

Records
Leading jockey since 1988 (6 wins):
 Kevin Manning - Law Library (1997), Abigail Pett (2005), Maoineach (2008), Leitir Mor (2012), Smash Williams (2015), New Treasure (2020)

Leading trainer since 1988 (7 wins):
 Aidan O'Brien - Warrior Queen (1999), Cherokee (2004), Great White Eagle (2013), Intelligence Cross (2016), U S Navy Flag (2017), Ten Sovereigns (2018), Lope Y Fernandez (2019)
 Jim Bolger - Bufalino (1900), Law Library (1997), Abigail Pett (2005), Maoineach (2008), Leitir Mor (2012), Smash Williams (2015), New Treasure (2020)

Winners since 1988

See also
 Horse racing in Ireland
 List of Irish flat horse races

References
 Racing Post:

 galopp-sieger.de – Round Tower Stakes.
 horseracingintfed.com – International Federation of Horseracing Authorities – Round Tower Stakes (2018).
 pedigreequery.com – Round Tower Stakes – Curragh.

Flat races in Ireland
Curragh Racecourse
Flat horse races for two-year-olds